A list of films produced by the Turkish film industry in Turkey in 2016.

Released films

January to March

See also
2016 in Turkey

References

2016
Turkey
Films
2016 in Turkish cinema